Chrysopa perla, the pearly green lacewing, is an insect species belonging to the green lacewing family, Chrysopidae (subfamily Chrysopinae).

Distribution
This widespread species is present in most of Europe and in temperate zones of Asia.

Habitat
These insects prefer cool and shady areas, mainly in deciduous woods, wet forests, woodland edges,  hedge rows, scrubby grassland and shrubs.

Description
The basic coloration of the body is green. Wings are blue-green with black veins. They turn pale yellow during the winter. Several black markings are present on the head, the thorax and below the abdomen. The second antennal segment is black. This species is rather similar to Chrysopa dorsalis, showing an oval pale spot between the eyes, which is roundish in C. perla.

Biology
Adults can be encountered from May through August. They are fearsome predators, primarily feeding on aphids, occasionally on flower nectar.

The females usually lay eggs near aphid colonies. Larvae are predators, mainly feeding on Aphididae, Coccidae species and caterpillars (Pieris brassicae, Autographa gamma). The adult insects hibernate in winter.

Gallery

References

Further reading
[ Chrysopa perla] p. 417 in

External links
 Uniprot
 
 

Chrysopidae
Insects described in 1758
Articles containing video clips
Insects of Asia
Neuroptera of Europe
Taxa named by Carl Linnaeus